Robert "Bob" Lucien LeGendre (January 7, 1898 – January 21, 1931) was an American track and field athlete. He competed in the pentathlon at the 1920 and 1924 Summer Olympics and finished in fourth and third place, respectively. He won the pentathlon at the Inter-Allied Games in 1919, beating Eugene Vidal and Géo André.

While studying at the Georgetown University, LeGendre also played American football and baseball. He earned Ph.D. and D.D.S. degrees there and signed a Hollywood contract as a film actor. He abandoned the movie career and became a dentist in Washington.

References

External links

profile
At 1924 Olympics, Lewiston’s Bob Legendre leaped into history

1898 births
1931 deaths
Sportspeople from Lewiston, Maine
American male decathletes
American pentathletes
Olympic bronze medalists for the United States in track and field
Athletes (track and field) at the 1920 Summer Olympics
Athletes (track and field) at the 1924 Summer Olympics
Medalists at the 1924 Summer Olympics
American male long jumpers
Track and field athletes from Maine